Stenopelmatinae is the sole subfamily in the family Stenopelmatidae. There are about 7 genera and more than 50 described species in Stenopelmatinae.

The species of this subfamily found in the New World are called Jerusalem crickets, making up the genera Ammopelmatus and Stenopelmatus. These were formerly the only genera of this subfamily, and now make up the tribe Stenopelmatini. Old World species have also been referred to as Jerusalem crickets in recent years, as well as sand crickets and stone crickets.

Tribes and Genera
The Orthoptera Species File lists five tribes in the subfamily Stenopelmatinae:

Monotypic tribes
 Maxentius Stål, 1876 (sub-Saharan Africa)
 Oryctopterus Karny, 1937 (India, Sri Lanka)
 Oryctopus Brunner von Wattenwyl, 1888 (India, Sri Lanka)

Siini
 † Electrosia Gorochov, 2010 (Baltic amber)
 Sia Giebel, 1861 (Malaysia, Indonesia)

Stenopelmatini
 Ammopelmatus Tinkham, 1965 (North America) - Jerusalem crickets
 Stenopelmatus Burmeister, 1838 (New World) - Jerusalem crickets

References

Stenopelmatoidea
Orthoptera subfamilies